Downplay is an American alternative metal band formed in Athens, Ohio, in 2001, and is now based in Columbus, Ohio. The group consists of vocalist Dustin Bates, bassist Ron DeChant, and drummer Brian Patrick. The band has released five full studio albums and three EPs to date and have recorded with producer Dave Fortman. Their song, "Hated You From Hello" was featured for Game Changer of the Year in the 2011 WWE Slammys.

History

Formation and Saturday (2001–2006) 
Downplay originated near Youngstown, OH, in Salem, in 2001. Originally a cover band, they entertained crowds in bars before many of its members were old enough to drink. Soon after, the band (composed of Dustin Bates, Brandon Hill, Nick Kiser, and Chad White) moved to Ohio University in Athens, where two of the original members enrolled. Over the next three years the band developed its sound and live show and found a major fan base in the Athens area while attending school there.

One story says that the band's name was ironically stumbled upon during one of the many fights that occurred during the early days of the original Downplay line-up (Bates, Hill, George Andres, and Greg Huzyak (locally known for his soulful basslines and funky grooves that helped lay the foundation for the band’s hard rock sets) as Bates accused another band member of "downplaying" his role in the argument. But it has been said in interviews that Bates did not want their original music to be downplayed whilst they were still a cover band.

In 2005, Downplay reorganized as an original band. Their first studio album, Saturday, was recorded "in about a day" on a $1,000 budget at Ohio University's student-run audio production studio and released during its time at OU. It included a “bonus track,” a spoof hip-hop song about an OU frat bar, "The Crystal", which became a student/bar favorite with over 3,000 downloads. Downplay found its niche for energetic live rock shows at Ohio University, playing famous events like the Halloween Block Party, PalmerFest, and the numbered fests (threefest fourfest, fivefest, etc.). In 2006, upon most of the members graduating from OU, the band moved to Columbus, OH, and played a mix of covers and original music.

A Day Without Gravity (2007–2009) 
Downplay returned to the studio in late 2007, this time at Cleveland-based Jungle Recording Studio. Around the same time Bates, with the contribution of loyal friends, established an indie rock record label (True Anomaly Records, LLC), and signed Downplay to the label under a one-album contract. A Day Without Gravity was released in October. The cost of the second studio album was approximately $16,000. This record had a more polished sound and displayed the band's improvements in song writing over their first album, and helped the band begin to expand across the state of Ohio. In 2008, Mike Mealey became Downplay's fifth member. The band's lineup was then reconfigured completely, save for Bates and Mealey, in 2009.

The year of 2009 was full of showcases for Atlantic, Virgin/Capitol, Island, Mercury, and Epic Records, both in Columbus and in New York City for Downplay. On November 17, they released their first EP Rise. Fall. Repeat. From this time into the first half of 2010, Bobby Withers, Ron DeChant, Derek Snowden, and Brandon Zano were in the band for a short amount of time.

Line-up change and record deal (2010–2011) 
The band signed with In De Goot Management in April 2010 and went on their first major tour with Puddle of Mudd and Sevendust. In June, the band signed with Epic Records. Immediately after, Bates went to Los Angeles to begin writing the first major-label debut. "We're the first hard rock band to sign with Epic Records in the last five years," said Bates. Throughout this period, Downplay accumulated the lineup of Trevor Connor, Evan Mckeever, Brian Patrick and Corey Catlett. As a holder of an electrical engineering degree and a master's degree in avionic engineering, Bates said he was moving toward a PhD at Ohio University, "clear up until the record deal."

In January 2011, Downplay began recording their third record with producer Dave Fortman (Evanescence, Slipknot, Mudvayne, Godsmack) in New Orleans where they cut their first album. The working title was Sleep;  the album would have 12 songs and two bonus tracks available for download from iTunes, as well as a different track from Amazon. It was finished in May 2011. Downplay played with a number of rock bands, including Chevelle, 10 Years, Theory of a Deadman, Crossfade, and others at a number of major rock festivals, including Rock on the Range in Columbus and XFest in Dayton. In October 2011, after realizing that the album that was recorded for Epic would not come out until 2012, the band quickly got in the studio and recorded an album that was to be released on December 1 for all the fans that they had promised a record to by the end of 2011, which turned out to be their third studio album Beyond the Machine. Then later in the month, the band was dropped by Epic Records so the label could sign bands from the new TV show, The X-Factor. In December, Downplay released their first music video for their song, "Digging It Out". After the release of Beyond the Machine, their song "Hated You From Hello" was used by WWE.

Radiocalypse (2012–2013) 
Downplay released their fourth studio album, Radiocalypse, in May 2012. Their second music video, for the song "Where Did You Go", was released the following month. During this time, DeChant rejoined the band.

In July, Downplay announced that Connor was leaving the band to pursue other interests. On the day before the release of Downplay's second EP, The Human Condition, Connor died in a car accident. Later in the week, the band performed a tribute to Connor on 99.7 The Blitz.

In July 2013, Downplay announced on their website that they had "recently signed a licensing contract with NASCAR" allowing them to use over a dozen of their songs and that the band would be going on a short break and would likely go into the studio "sooner than later." On the following day, the band released an acoustic record, their debut compilation album, titled Stripped.

During an AMA on Reddit in August 2014, Bates revealed that he is still working on new music for Downplay, but has not received the "blessing" of the label to release it. By this time, he had released an album with a new project, featuring Bates and bandmate Ron DeChant, Starset.

On February 6, 2016, DeChant posted a band reunion photo of himself and Bates together with former members of Downplay, including Hill, Kiser, McKeever, Mealey and White.

In December 2019, Dustin shared his 2019 Spotify wrapped info-graph of Downplay with the caption "I should release some more of this."

Band members 
Current
Dustin Bates – lead vocals, guitar 
Ron DeChant – bass, keyboards, backing vocals  
Brian Patrick – drums, percussion 

Past members
George Andres – lead guitar 
Greg Huzyak – bass 
Brandon Hill – drums 
Nick Kiser – guitar 
Chad White – bass 
Mike Mealey – bass 
Bobby Withers – lead guitar 
Derek Snowden – rhythm guitar 
Brandon Zano – rhythm guitar 
Trevor Connor – lead guitar 
Corey Catlett – bass, backing vocals 
Evan McKeever – rhythm guitar, backing vocals 
 Timeline

Discography
Albums
 Saturday (2005)
 A Day Without Gravity  (2007)
 Beyond The Machine (2011)
 Radiocalypse (2012)

Compilations
 Stripped (2013)

EPs
 Rise. Fall. Repeat (2009)
 The Human Condition (2012)

Singles
 "Hated You From Hello" (2011)
 "Dark on Me" (2012)

Videos
 "Digging It Out" (2011)
 "Where Did You Go" (2012)
 "We"ll Be Kings" (2012)
 "Down With The Fallen" (2013)

Notable appearances
Rock on the Range 2011
X-Fest 2011 in Dayton, Ohio

References

External links

Epic Records artists
Alternative rock groups from Ohio
American alternative metal musical groups